Zwarte Paard is a hamlet in the Dutch province of Gelderland. It is a part of the municipality of Buren, and lies about 7 km north of Tiel.

It was first mentioned in 1899 as Zwarte Paard, and translates to "black horse", however it is named after a house. The postal authorities have placed Zwarte Paard under Ingen. It consists of about 20 houses.

References

Populated places in Gelderland
Buren